Barton Kay Kirkham (November 29, 1936 – June 7, 1958) was a member of the United States Air Force who was discharged in 1955 after committing a robbery in Colorado while absent without leave (AWOL). In 1956, he was sentenced to death after the murder of two grocery store clerks during an armed robbery in Salt Lake City, Utah.

Kirkham chose to die by hanging to generate publicity and become an inconvenience to the state of Utah. Though an attempt was made to appeal his conviction by questioning his sanity, prison officials noted that Kirkham's defiant attitude remained remorseless until shortly before his execution, at which point he started crying and is reported to have wet himself. His hanging at Utah State Prison in 1958 was the first to be carried out by the state in 46 years. Kirkham is the last prisoner to be hanged by the state of Utah.

Background
Barton Kay Kirkham was the eldest of five children raised by a Mormon family in Salt Lake City. He was a fan of bop music and described himself as "a rebel." Kirkham left his family's church life and school in the 11th grade and joined the United States Air Force. After 18 months, he committed a robbery while absent without leave in Colorado, and was given an undesirable discharge from the service. Kirkham spent the next 9 months in a reformatory and was paroled in July 1956.

Murders
On the night of August 12, 1956, Kirkham entered the Nibley Park Market grocery store in Salt Lake City to rob it. When he thought 50-year-old storekeeper David Avon Frame was not giving him all of the money that he had, Kirkham took Frame to the back of the store. There he found 37-year-old Ruth Holmes Webster, mother of four children in Sandy, Utah. Kirkham had them kneel on the floor and shot them in the head. He netted $54 from the robbery.

Kirkham was apprehended the next morning after he forced a brother and sister to take him on a joyride through Provo Canyon. When later asked about his motive for killing Frame and Webster, he said, "Man, I don't know..."

Trial and sentencing
The first-degree murder trial commenced on December 12, 1956, with Judge Martin M. Larson presiding over the case. Kirkham was defended by attorneys Lamar C. Duncan and Wayne L. Black. On December 14, Kirkham was found guilty of murdering Frame, without a recommendation for mercy, and faced a mandatory death sentence. He was never tried for the murder of Webster. Kirkham was remanded to Utah State Prison on January 11, 1957, as the sentencing phase of the trial proceeded. Kirkham's attorneys immediately filed an appeal with the Utah Supreme Court. The appeal claimed that their client's mental state was not properly taken into account. On March 25, 1958, the court upheld Kirkham's conviction and denied his request for a rehearing, sending his case back for sentencing. Kirkham said he was certain he would be executed and resented his attorneys' "trying to prolong the waiting and stalling around."

On April 26, 1958, Judge Larson sentenced Kirkham to death. When asked to select between the option of execution by firing squad and hanging, he responded: "What costs most?" Kirkham said he chose to be hanged "because of the publicity... the novelty... to put the state to more inconvenience." He also noted that the state might not execute him in that manner, and he might therefore get off "scot free". It would be the first hanging in Utah since 1912. Kirkham said that he hoped "to set some sort of record."

Incarceration

While on death row at Utah State Prison, Kirkham followed newspaper articles and legal briefs of his case and read psychiatric texts and medical journals. Warden Marcell Graham described him as a good prisoner who caused little trouble. Kirkham grew out his hair and beard for 13 months until ordered to get a haircut. He then shaved himself bald to annoy the prison officials. Kirkham maintained a hardened image and reportedly laughed off concepts of mercy or religious salvation. He claimed to have no regret over the killings.

On June 4, 1958, Kirkham appeared before the state pardons board for a final hearing for clemency. His attorneys had planned to demonstrate that he was insane with the help of psychiatrists. Kirkham initially told the board that he was a loner and felt "no remorse or anything like that." In the final minutes of the hearing, he broke out into an appeal that he would prefer involuntary commitment in a mental institution over capital punishment. The board declined to commute his sentence.

Execution

Kirkham was visited by his parents the night before his hanging. Prison guards noted that he changed his demeanor as he received his parents warmly and was seen by Mormon and Roman Catholic chaplains. His mother was near collapse. Kirkham watched a movie with his parents and said farewell shortly before midnight. Kirkham ordered a last meal of pizza and ice cream, telling the prison steward that "you get cheese, meat and everything in one meal. Not so much fuss." In the auditorium of Utah State Prison, Kirkham ate his pizza and played classical music on a piano in the company of the chaplains, news reporters and deputy sheriffs. He joked about his impending execution and commented on his keyboard skills: "I'll just have to practice more."

At dawn on June 7, 1958, Kirkham was driven two miles to a pasture on the prison's farm. After a black hood was placed over his head, Kirkham was led up a ramp to a newly built gallows. His drop had been measured at 6 feet to accommodate his reported weight of 200 pounds. A professional hangman from the Northwest was paid $400 for his services. Kirkham trembled slightly as the hangman fitted a noose around his neck and placed the knot under his left ear. As directed by state law, Sheriff George Beckstead walked up to Kirkham to receive his last words. At 4:57 a.m. MST, the official time of dawn, Beckstead signaled the hangman, who pulled an iron lever opening the trap door under Kirkham. The Kirkham family did not come to witness the execution. Prison physician W. C. Knott climbed on a stepladder to examine Kirkham's hanging body, which was concealed from view by burlap and canvas hung under the 11-foot-high platform. He was pronounced dead at 5:11 AM.

In February 1980, the Utah State Legislature replaced the option of hanging with lethal injection.

See also 
Capital punishment in Utah
Capital punishment in the United States
List of people executed in Utah
Religion and capital punishment

References

External links
State of Utah vs. Barton Kay Kirkham – Utah Supreme Court (January 6, 1958)

1936 births
1958 deaths
20th-century executions by Utah
Latter Day Saints from Utah
American people convicted of murder
American robbers
Executed people from Utah
People convicted of murder by Utah
People executed by Utah by hanging
American people executed for murder
Military personnel from Salt Lake City
20th-century executions of American people
1956 murders in the United States